Christopher Howard Jasper (born December 30, 1951) is an American singer, composer, and producer. Jasper is a former member of the Isley Brothers and Isley-Jasper-Isley and is responsible for writing and producing the majority of the Isley Brothers music (1973–1983) and Isley-Jasper-Isley music (1984–1987).  He is also a successful solo musician and record producer, recording over 17 of his own solo albums, including 4 urban contemporary gospel albums, all written, produced and performed, both vocally and instrumentally, by Jasper. He also produces artists for his New York City-based record label, Gold City Records. Jasper's keyboard and Moog synthesizer work was a primary ingredient of the Isley Brothers' sound of the 1970s and 1980s (the "gold and platinum" years) when the Isley Brothers were a self-contained band.

Biography
Jasper is a classically trained musician and composer. The youngest of seven siblings, he started studying classical music at the age of 7 at the suggestion of his mother, Elizabeth. After graduating from high school in Cincinnati, he moved to New York to study music composition at the Juilliard School of Music in New York City. He continued his studies at C.W. Post, Long Island University, New York, where he studied with jazz pianist and composer Billy Taylor and received a Bachelor of Fine Arts Degree in music composition. He subsequently graduated from Concord University School of Law.

The Jasper and Isley families lived in the same apartment complex in Cincinnati. While still living in Cincinnati, Jasper's older sister, Elaine, married Rudolph Isley. His vocal trio formed by the three older brothers, Rudolph, Ronald and O'Kelly, subsequently relocated to Teaneck, New Jersey. While living temporarily in Teaneck with his sister as a young teenager and attending Teaneck High School, Jasper and the two younger Isleys, Marvin and Ernie, formed a band, "The Jazzman Trio" with Jasper on keyboards, Ernie on drums, and Marvin on bass. The band played local gigs in the New Jersey area. Along with Jasper, Marvin and Ernie also attended C.W. Post College in New York. While still in college, Jasper, Ernie, and Marvin toured with the older Isley Brothers and played on the earlier recordings, including "It's Your Thing". Jasper's first of many songs written for the Isley Brothers was "Love Put Me on a Corner" released on the Isleys' Brother, Brother, Brother album in 1972.

In 1973, Jasper, Marvin, and Ernie brought the songwriting and musical component to the older Isley Brothers' vocal trio, transitioning the Isley Brothers into a self-produced, self-contained six-member R&B/Funk band. Their debut release during this time was the 3+3 album. Although all six members of the Isley Brothers are credited as songwriters of the music from the 3+3 era, this was a business arrangement and does not reflect the creative reality. Jasper was the primary songwriter, producer, and arranger of The Isley Brothers music from 1973 (3+3) through 1983 (Between the Sheets), with contributions by younger members Ernie and Marvin Isley. Between The Sheets was their final album as a six-member group. Jasper's arrangements, instrumentation, and unique chord structures as a classically trained musician have been credited as the foundation of the legendary "Isley Brothers sound", which Jasper has continued in his own solo recordings.

In 1984, the six-member group disbanded, primarily due to tax and other financial problems that did not involve the younger members of the group. Jasper, Marvin, and Ernie decided to remain with CBS and record as "Isley-Jasper-Isley" while the older Isley brothers departed the label and unsuccessfully sued the younger brothers and CBS Records in an attempt to prevent the younger brothers from recording for CBS. Isley-Jasper-Isley was a self-contained, self-produced trio with Jasper as lead singer and continuing his role as the primary songwriter, producer, and arranger. The trio released three albums on CBS Records. Jasper wrote and sang lead on the group's biggest hit, "Caravan of Love", which was covered by English recording artist the Housemartins, who made the song a #1 international hit.

In 1987, Isley-Jasper-Isley disbanded when Ernie Isley resigned from the group, left CBS, and released a solo album on another label.  Marvin Isley rejoined The Isley Brothers and toured with the band. Ernie Isley later rejoined the older brothers and currently tours with brother Ronald billing themselves as "The Isley Brothers".

Jasper continued on as a solo artist and released two albums on his CBS-Associated label, Gold City Records, including the #1 R&B hit "Superbad" in 1988, a song which emphasized the importance of education, a theme Jasper continues to emphasize in many of the songs he has written since his days with the Isleys. In 1989, Jasper wrote, produced and performed on "Make It Last" for Chaka Khan's CK album. To date, Jasper has released 16 solo albums, including 4 gospel albums. Jasper's January 2013 release titled Inspired: By Love, By Life, By The Spirit was a compilation of love songs as well as socially conscious and spiritual tracks. In May 2014, he released The One, reminiscent of the soulful R&B and funk music he wrote for the Isleys. In 2016, he released Share With Me with a cover of the Billy Preston hit, "You Are So Beautiful", and a track called "America", a tribute to the nation and a call to come together. In April 2018, Jasper pre-released a double-A single "The Love That You Give/It's a Miracle" from his 15th solo CD Dance With You. In 2019, Jasper released a "covers" album entitled "For The Love Of You" which included versions of some of the songs Jasper wrote for The Isley Brothers, including the title track, as well as some well-known R&B and pop classics, including renditions of Sam Cooke's "Nothing Can Change This Love," Marvin Gaye's "God Is Love," and Van Morrison's "Have I Told You Lately."

Jasper has continued to write, record, and perform all the music on his solo albums and produce artists for his Gold City label, including Liz Hogue, Out Front, and Brothaz By Choice. The most recent addition to the Gold City label is Jasper's son, Michael Jasper, a songwriter, recording artist, and screenplay writer. In 2015, in conjunction with Sony Music, Jasper released the Essential Chris Jasper, which encompasses all of the tracks that Jasper sang lead on during the Isley-Jasper-Isley years and his solo career at CBS/Sony Music.

The music Jasper wrote for the Isley Brothers has been covered and sampled by numerous new and established recording artists, including Whitney Houston, Aaliyah, Notorious B.I.G., Tupac Shakur, Queen Latifah, Jay-Z, Snoop Dogg, Gwen Stefani, Fantasia, Will Smith, and Jaheim. Jasper has received numerous gold and platinum albums and music industry awards. Jasper, along with the other members of the Isley Brothers, was inducted into the Rock & Roll Hall of Fame in 1992. In January 2014, Jasper and the Isley Brothers were honored with the Grammy Lifetime Achievement Award. In 2015, Jasper received the German Record Critics Lifetime Achievement Award ("Preis der deutschen Schallplattenkritik"). In 2016, Jasper was awarded the National R&B Society Lifetime Achievement Award. In 2020, Jasper was awarded the Soultracks Lifetime Achievement Award. In 2021, Jasper will be inducted into the Songwriters Hall of Fame.

Jasper lives in New York with his wife of 39 years, Margie Jasper, a New York-based attorney and author.

Discography

Isley Brothers years
 3+3 (CBS) 1973
 Live It Up (CBS) 1974
 The Heat Is On (CBS) 1975
 Harvest for the World (CBS) 1976
 Go for Your Guns (CBS) 1977
 Showdown  (CBS) 1978
 Winner Takes All (CBS) 1979
 Go All the Way (CBS) 1980
 Grand Slam  (CBS) 1981
 Inside You (CBS) 1981
 The Real Deal (CBS) 1982
 Between the Sheets (CBS) 1983

Isley-Jasper-Isley years
 Broadway's Closer to Sunset Blvd (CBS) 1984
 Caravan of Love (CBS) 1985
 Different Drummer (CBS) 1986

Solo career
 Superbad (Gold City/CBS Associated) 1988
 Time Bomb (Gold City/CBS Associated) 1989
 Praise the Eternal (Gold City) 1992
 Deep Inside (Gold City) 1994
 Faithful & True (Gold City) 2002
 Best of Chris Jasper...With Love (Gold City) 2003
 Amazing Love (Gold City) 2005
 Invincible (Gold City) 2007
 Everything I Do (Gold City) 2010
 Inspired...By Love, By Life, By The Spirit (Gold City) 2013
 The One (Gold City) (2014)
 Thank You Jesus (Gold City) (2015)
 The Essential Chris Jasper (Sony Legacy) (2015)
 Share With Me (Gold City) (2016)
 Happy Birthday Love (Gold City) (2017)
 I Love You (Boogie Back Remix-UK) (Gold City) (2017)
 That's What Love Can Do (Boogie Back Remix-UK) (Gold City) (2017)
 Dance with you (Gold City) (2018)
 For The Love Of You (Gold City) (2020)
 Raise The Bar (Gold City) (2022)

Production credits
 Vicious & Fresh (Liz Hogue) (Gold City/CBS) 1989
 Out Front (Out Front) (Gold City) 1995
 Brotha 2 Brotha (Brothaz By Choice) (Gold City) 1998
 "Make It Last" (on Chaka Khan's ck album) (WB) 1989
 Addictive (Michael Jasper) (Gold City) 2010
 Make It (Michael Jasper) (Gold City) (2016)
 Dreams (Michael Jasper) (Gold City) (Upcoming 2022)

See also
 List of Moog synthesizer players
 List of show business families

References

External links
 Chris Jasper on Facebook
 Chris Jasper's Youtube Channel
 Gold City Records
 Official Website of Michael Jasper
 Chris Jasper 2010 Audio Interview at Soulinterviews.com
 Chris Jasper 2012 Audio Interview at Soulinterviews.com
 Interview with Chris Jasper on Yuzu Melodies
Chris Jasper Interview - NAMM Oral History Library (2013)

1951 births
Living people
African-American Christians
African-American male singers
American male singers
African-American pianists
American male organists
American funk keyboardists
American funk singers
American soul keyboardists
American soul singers
Musicians from Cincinnati
Musicians from New Jersey
Teaneck High School alumni
The Isley Brothers members
American male pianists
21st-century organists
21st-century American keyboardists
20th-century American keyboardists
American organists